RStudio is an integrated development environment for R, a programming language for statistical computing and graphics.  It is available in two formats: RStudio Desktop is a regular desktop application while RStudio Server runs on a remote server and allows accessing RStudio using a web browser.

Licensing model 
The RStudio integrated development environment (IDE) is available with the GNU Affero General Public License version 3. The AGPL v3 is an open source license that guarantees the freedom to share the code.

RStudio Desktop and RStudio Server are both available in free and fee-based (commercial) editions. OS support depends on the format/edition of the IDE. Prepackaged distributions of RStudio Desktop are available for Windows, macOS, and Linux. RStudio Server and Server Pro run on Debian, Ubuntu, Red Hat Linux, CentOS, openSUSE and SLES.

Overview and History 

The RStudio IDE is partly written in the C++ programming language and uses the Qt framework for its graphical user interface. The bigger percentage of the code is written in Java. JavaScript is also used.

Work on the RStudio IDE started around December 2010, and the first public beta version (v0.92) was officially announced in February 2011. Version 1.0 was released on 1 November 2016. Version 1.1 was released on 9 October 2017.

In April 2018, RStudio PBC (at the time RStudio, Inc.) announced that it will provide operational and infrastructure support to Ursa Labs in support of the Labs focus on building a new data science runtime powered by Apache Arrow.

In April 2019, RStudio PBC (at the time RStudio, Inc.) released a new product, the RStudio Job Launcher. The Job Launcher is an adjunct to RStudio Server. The launcher provides the ability to start processes within various batch processing systems (e.g. Slurm) and container orchestration platforms (e.g. Kubernetes). This function is only available in RStudio Server Pro (fee-based application).

Packages
In addition to the RStudio IDE, RStudio PBC and its employees develop, maintain, and promote a number of R packages. These include:

Tidyverse – R packages for data science, including ggplot2, dplyr, tidyr, and purrr
 Shiny – an interactive web technology
 RMarkdown – Markdown documents make it easy for users to mix text with code of different languages, most commonly R.  However, the platform supports mixing R with Python, shell scripts, SQL, Stan, JavaScript, CSS, Julia, C, Fortran, and other languages in the same RMarkdown document.
flexdashboard – publish a group of related data visualizations as a dashboard
TensorFlow – open-source software library for Machine Intelligence. The R interface to TensorFlow lets you work productively using the high-level Keras and Estimator APIs and the core TensorFlow API
 Tidymodels – install and load tidyverse packages related to modeling and analysis
Sparklyr – provides bindings to Spark’s distributed machine learning library. Together with sparklyr’s dplyr interface, you can easily create and tune machine learning workflows on Spark, orchestrated entirely within R
Stringr – consistent, simple and easy-to-use set of wrappers around the 'stringi' package
Reticulate – provides a comprehensive set of tools for interoperability between Python and R.
Plumber – enables you to convert your existing R code into web APIs by merely adding a couple of special comments.
knitr – dynamic reports combining R, TeX, Markdown & HTML
 packrat – package dependency tool
 devtools – package development tool as well as helps to install R-packages from GitHub.
 sf – supports for simple features, a standardized way to encode spatial vector data. Binds to 'GDAL' for reading and writing data, to 'GEOS' for geometrical operations, and to 'PROJ' for projection conversions and datum transformations.

Addins 
The RStudio IDE provides a mechanism for executing R functions interactively from within the IDE through the Addins menu. This enables packages to include Graphical User Interfaces (GUIs) for increased accessibility. Popular packages that use this feature include:

 bookdown – a knitr extension to create books
 colourpicker – a graphical tool to pick colours for plots
datasets.load – a graphical tool to search and load datasets
 googleAuthR – Authenticate with Google APIs

Development
The RStudio IDE is developed by Posit, PBC, a public-benefit corporation founded by J. J. Allaire, creator of the programming language ColdFusion. Posit has no formal connection to the R Foundation, a not-for-profit organization located in Vienna, Austria, which is responsible for overseeing development of the R environment for statistical computing. Posit was formerly known as RStudio Inc. In July 2022, it announced that it changed its name to Posit, to signify its broadening exploration towards other programming languages such as Python.

See also

 R interfaces
 Comparison of integrated development environments

References

External links
 

Free R (programming language) software
R (programming language)
Science software for Linux
Software using the GNU AGPL license